CIOO-FM is a Canadian adult contemporary formatted radio station, broadcasting at 100.1 FM in Halifax, Nova Scotia. The station uses the on-air brand name Move 100. It was originally owned by Toronto based CHUM Limited until the company's buy-out by CTVglobemedia in 2007, and then Bell Media in 2011. CIOO's studios are located at the intersection of Russell and Agricola Streets in Halifax (right behind sister station CJCH-DT), with its transmitter located on Washmill Lake Drive in Clayton Park.

History
In 1976, Radio 920, Ltd., a division of CHUM Limited, applied to the Canadian Radio-television and Telecommunications Commission for a new FM radio station broadcasting at 100,000 watts with a dial position of 100.1 MHz. This would be the third FM radio station in Halifax after FM stations CBH-FM and CHFX-FM. Radio 920, Ltd. also owned CTV affiliate CJCH-TV and CJCH-AM. The CRTC subsequently approved the application.

On November 1, 1977, CIOO began broadcasting as an easy listening station using the branding C100. As a new decade approached, CIOO changed its programming format to album rock. This gave listeners an opportunity to hear more than just the top 40 hits from a particular artist, such as other songs not yet on AM radio. In 1983, CHUM Limited tested a simulcast project with new TV station ASN by airing Atlantic Canada's Choice, counting down the week's best albums from 20 to 1 that was simulcast on both radio and TV and hosted by Geoff Banks. This lasted until spring 1985, where the station again reformatted its programming.

The spring of 1985 saw the station take on another programming angle, Top 40 along with oldies, such as The Beach Boys among others. This format was phased out not long after, when the station moved towards adult contemporary. The station utilized such slogans as "Lite Rock... Less Talk", "Great Light Rock Hits" and "...Even More Lite Rock Hits". CIOO moved to its current Hot AC format in 1993. Like most xAC stations in Canada, CIOO leans rhythmic, though not as heavy as sister station CHUM-FM/Toronto. With sister station CJCH-FM adopting a Rhythmic/Dance Top 40 presentation by 2013, CIOO has modified its playlist towards a conventional Adult Top 40 direction. New sister stations since 2013 are Truro-based CKTY-FM and CKTO-FM.

On December 21, 1984, CHUM Limited was denied a license to add an FM transmitter at 94.9 MHz in Middleton to rebroadcast the programming of CIOO.

On December 27, 2020, as part of a mass format reorganization by Bell Media, CIOO rebranded as Move 100, ending 43 years of the "C100" branding. While the station would run jockless for the first week of the format, on-air staff would return on January 4, 2021.

In 2022, CIOO flipped to adult contemporary.

Features (prior to 2020)
 The Breakfast Club is the weekday morning program on CIOO. The show airs from 6:30am–10:00am, having extended from its old hours of 6:00am–9:00am. It was originally hosted by Kelly Latremouille, Peter Harrison and Moya Farrell until mid-2007. Latremouille had debuted with the station in the summer of 1993, replacing John Biggs, who took Latremouille's position with 92 CJCH AM at that time. After Latremouille's departure in late June 2007, Adam Marriott became an interim host along with Harrison and Farrell. On August 17, 2008, Brad Dryden joined the Breaskfast Club as Latremouille's replacement. In August 2015, JC Douglas became Dryden's replacement on the Show. In January 2017, Melody Rose became Farrell's replacement after she retired from the station after 35 years. In November 2020, Douglas and Rose were released by Bell Media citing "programming changes".

Long before the Breakfast Club, the station used one DJ personality. Geoff Banks hosted the morning show for the better part of the 1980s, before Biggs took over and shortly thereafter forming the show they have today.

 The Top 9 at 9 is a countdown of the day's most requested songs. It is heard each weekday morning and weeknight at 9:00. When this show first aired in 1993, it was the Top 7 at 7. Currently, it has moved back to the latter name.
 Retro Request Sunday with Nicolle, heard every Sunday morning from 8am-noon, focuses on music from the 1980s. When the 80's boom started its resurgence in 1995, CIOO ran the program from 8–10:00am on Saturday mornings. This time slot lasted for around 8 years, with the format sometimes running from 8:00 till noon.
 The Atlantic Canada Countdown with Matt & Deb is CIOO's weekly countdown of the most popular music of the week in Atlantic Canada. It is heard Sunday mornings from 8 to 10 AM.

CIOO formerly broadcast the radio version of the MuchMoreMusic countdown, but stopped airing it sometime in 2007.

 The C100 Summer Cruiser is a mobile prize machine team who broadcast their secret location around the Halifax Regional Municipality multiple times throughout the day all summer. Prizes vary every summer but in the past have included free concert tickets, movie passes, museum passes, gift certificates, C100 'gear' and a chance to fill out a ballot to win a weekly prize or 1 grand prize. A recent addition to the prize rotation are C100 window stickers. Although no official contest regarding the stickers has been announced, there is growing speculation that it will be something quite worthwhile.

CIOO brands itself as playing the most music for Halifax  with:
 100 Minutes of Commercial Free Music airs weekdays 9:00am – 10:40am.
 60 Minutes of Commercial Free Drive Home airs weekdays 4:00pm – 5:00pm.
 40 Minutes of Commercial Free Music airs every hour, every day.

Every Year on New Year's Eve, CIOO plays the top 100 songs of the radio stations of that year.

References

External links
 Move 100
 
 

IOO
IOO
IOO
Radio stations established in 1977
1977 establishments in Nova Scotia